The Voice of the Mountain (Sawt al-Jabal) was a radio station operated by the Progressive Socialist Party during the Lebanese Civil War.

History and profile
Although its beginning was in 1983, the broadcasting of the Voice of the Mountain officially started on 1 February 1984. It operated from the Chouf Mountains. Ghazi Aridi worked as the director of the station until 1994 when it was closed.

References

1984 establishments in Lebanon
1994 disestablishments in Lebanon
Radio stations established in 1984
Radio stations disestablished in 1994
Radio stations in Lebanon
Progressive Socialist Party
Arabic-language radio stations
Pan-Arabist media